General elections were held in Bolivia on 5 June 1960. Víctor Paz Estenssoro of the Revolutionary Nationalist Movement (MNR) was elected President with 76% of the vote, whilst the MNR retained its large majority in Congress.

Results

References

Elections in Bolivia
1960 elections in South America
1960 in Bolivia
1960
June 1960 events in South America